Amanda Lear discography consists of eighteen full-length studio albums, thirty-eight compilation albums, two extended plays and seventy-three singles. She has also released one video album and numerous music videos.

Background
Lear achieved the greatest international success between 1976 and 1983 when she was signed to West German label Ariola Records. The six Ariola albums were all released in Continental Europe as well as Scandinavia, Japan, South America and some parts of the former Eastern Bloc. Lear was in fact one of the very few Western artists in the 1970s to have her music officially released in the Soviet Union, on state-owned label Melodiya.

Following her initial signing to Ariola, various other labels were used to distribute her records in other nations, for example Chrysalis Records in the United States, Les Disques Direction Records, Siamese Records and Inter Global Records/Epic Records in Canada, RCA Victor in Australasia and South America, Columbia Records/Nippon Columbia in Japan, Eurodisc and Arabella in France, Epic Records in Greece and Cyprus, PGP-RTB in Yugoslavia, and Polydor, RCA Victor and Ariola in Italy. In other European countries like Sweden, albums and singles were first imported West German Ariola pressings. With Lear achieving mainstream success in Sweden in 1980 with album Diamonds for Breakfast, the Scandinavian Ariola distributor, CBS Records, did however start manufacturing its own pressings of both albums and singles to meet with public demand. They also issued singles like "When" in 1980 and "Nymphomania" in 1981, targeted for the Scandinavian market specifically, although these tracks were never A-side releases in West Germany or any other territory.

Despite full-page ads by US licensee Chrysalis Records in Billboard magazine for Sweet Revenge, her personal connections with Bowie and Roxy Music, a feature in Andy Warhol's Interview magazine with photos by Karl Stoecker (the photographer who shot the cover of Roxy Music's For Your Pleasure) and a two-month long promotional tour in the United States in early 1979 that included appearances at discothèques and gay clubs like New York's Paradise Garage, The Saint and The Loft, Lear's commercial success in North America was moderate. Her career as a recording artist in the United Kingdom was similarly lacklustre. Despite promotional gimmicks like red vinyl 12" singles and the Never Trust a Pretty Face album being released as a limited edition picture disc, "the English remained immune to the effect of Amanda Lear", as she has herself described it.

In 1982, Lear took legal action against Ariola-Eurodisc in order to be released from her recording contract on the grounds of artistic differences. The lawsuit was unsuccessful and she remained with the label as stipulated in the original deal until the end of 1983, resulting in single "Incredibilmente donna" and album Tam-Tam being recorded in Italy and double A-side single "Love Your Body"/"Darkness and Light" with Anthony Monn's sound engineer Peter Lüdemann. The relationship between Lear, Monn and her former record company was to stay strained all the way into the late 1990s. Since parting with Ariola-Eurodisc, as of the late eighties a daughter label of BMG-Ariola and eventually absorbed into what is now Sony Music, Lear has been signed to the following labels:
 WEA Italiana (1984) for single "Assassino". Now a part of Warner Music Group.
 Five Records, Italy (1984–1986) for single "Ritmo Salsa" and EP A L. Former Italian label, now defunct.
 Merak Music, Italy (1985–1986) for singles "No Credit Card" and "Women". Former Italian label, now defunct.
 Carrere Records/Carrere Disques, France (1986–1990) for albums Secret Passion and Tant qu'il y aura des hommes, and singles "Les Femmes", "Aphrodisiaque", "Follow Me" (1987 re-recording) and "Thank You". Carrere Records is now a part of the Warner Music Group. European publishing rights to album Secret Passion and worldwide rights to album Tant qu'il y aura des hommes with the exception of title "Métamorphose" are held by Siebenpunkts Verlags GmbH, Germany.
 Virgin Records, Italy (1988) for tracks "Tomorrow (Voulez-vous un rendez-vous)" and "Inch'Allah ça va" with band CCCP Fedeli alla linea. Now a sublabel of EMI.
 Ricordi International, Italy (1989) for album Uomini più uomini. European publishing rights to eight tracks from the album are held by Siebenpunkts Verlags GmbH, Germany.
 Disco 3, Italy (1990) for single "Do You Remember Me?". Former Italian label, now defunct.
 Indisc, Belgium (1992) for single "Fantasy".
 ZYX Music, Germany (1993–1995) for single "Fantasy" and album Alter Ego.
 Chène Music, France (1993) for album Cadavrexquis. Worldwide publishing rights to the album held by Siebenpunkts Verlags GmbH, Germany.
 Giungla Records, Italy (1995) for single "Everytime You Touch Me". Worldwide publishing rights to the track held by Siebenpunkts Verlags GmbH, Germany.
 Dig-It International, Italy (1998). Former Italian label, now defunct. Worldwide publishing rights to eleven tracks on album Back in Your Arms, remixes of 1998 re-recording of "Queen of Chinatown" and tracks "Mellow Yellow", "They're Coming to Take Me Away, Ha-Haaa!" and "C'est si bon" held by Siebenpunkts Verlags GmbH, Germany.
 EMI, France (2000) for Paris Pride re-recording of "Follow Me".
 Caus-N'-ff-ct Records, Germany (2000) for cover version of Giorgio Moroder's "From Here to Eternity". Sublabel of Sony BMG. Publishing rights to the track held by Siebenpunkts Verlags GmbH, Germany.
 Le Marais Prod., France (2001–2002) for album Heart.
 Ice Records, Italy (2002) for track "Cocktail d'amore".
 Virgin Records, Belgium (2002) for single "Beats of Love" with boy band Get Ready!. Sublabel of EMI Music Group.
 Sony BMG, Italy (2004) for single "Martini Disease" with Jetlag.
 Edina Music, France (2005) for compilation Forever Glam!.
 Dance Street Music, France/Germany (2005–2007) for single "Paris by Night" and album With Love. Publishing rights held by Siebenpunkts Verlags GmbH, Germany.
 Just Good Music for Your Ears, Italy (2009) for the Brief Encounters album trilogy.
 Edina Music, France (2009–2010) for EP Brand New Love Affair and single "I'm Coming Up".
 Outsider Music, United States (2010) for single "I'm Coming Up".
 Boomlover (2011–present) for albums I Don't Like Disco, My Happiness and Let Me Entertain You.

Albums

Studio albums

Reissues

Compilation albums

EPs

Singles

As lead artist

As featured artist

Video albums

Music videos

References

External links
 Amanda Lear at Allmusic
 Amanda Lear at Discogs
 Amanda Lear at Rate Your Music
 
 
 
 

Discographies of French artists
Pop music discographies